Dalton H. Pritchard (September 1, 1921 - April 18, 2010), was one of the early color television systems  pioneers, working at RCA Laboratories.

Early life
Dalton Pritchard earned a BSEE degree in Electronics from Mississippi State University in 1943. He received specialized radar training at Harvard University and MIT when he  entered the U.S. Army Signal Corps, then served as captain in the Asiatic-Pacific Theater during World War II. He was awarded the Bronze Star Medal.

RCA career
In 1946  Pritchard joined RCA Laboratories as a Member of the Technical Staff at Riverhead, NY, where he was engaged in communications research. In 1950 he transferred to RCA laboratories, Princeton, NJ. There his research involved many aspects of color television systems development, receivers, color kinescopes, transmitting encoders, cameras, and magnetic recording of TV. This work included the planning and testing of systems and circuits proposed for adoption by the National Television System Committee (NTSC).
Between 1960 and 1970 Mr. Pritchard worked developing video processing circuitry for color TV receivers, colorimetry and decoder matrix methods, information display techniques, and analog techniques employing charge-coupled devices for TV applications. He also worked on Selectavision VideoDisc development. 
As a member of the Television Research Laboratory, Mr. Pritchard was involved  in research related to high-definition TV (HDTV) systems that include applications of digital signal processing techniques.

Awards
Pritchard received seven RCA Laboratories Outstanding Achievement Awards. He is a Fellow of the IEEE and of SID and member of Sigma Xi, Tau Beta Pi, and Kappa Mu Epsilon. He is listed in American Men and Women of Science and in Who's Who in the East.

In 1975 he was appointed a Fellow of the Technical Staff, RCA laboratories.

In 1977, he received the Vladimir K. Zworykin Award for "significant contributions to color television technology" at the IEEE Consumer Electronics Spring Conference, Chicago.

In 1981, he was a team member recipient of the David Sarnoff Award for Outstanding Technical Achievement,  "for the development and implementation of a CCD comb filter integrated circuit in color TV receivers." He  was also appointed a member of the New Jersey Governor's state panel of Science Advisers.

In 1983 Mr. Pritchard was elected to membership in the U.S. National Academy of Engineering (NAE).

Patents
Mr. Pritchard holds 54 U.S. patents.

Amateur radio operator
Pritchard was an Amateur Radio Operator First Class.

Death
Pritchard died April 18, 2010 at Hilton Head Hospital Hilton Head Island, South Carolina.

References

Television pioneers
1921 births
2010 deaths
American electrical engineers
Mississippi State University alumni
RCA people
Analog electronics engineers
Fellow Members of the IEEE
Harvard University people
Massachusetts Institute of Technology people
People from Riverhead (town), New York
People from Princeton, New Jersey
People from Hilton Head, South Carolina
Amateur radio people
Members of the United States National Academy of Engineering
United States Army personnel of World War II